Basil Matthew II was the Syriac Orthodox Maphrian of the East from 1713 until his death in 1727.

Biography
Matthew was born at Mosul in the 17th century, and was the son of Maqdisi Lazarus. He had a brother named Isaac. Matthew became a monk at the nearby monastery of Saint Matthew before 1672, and was later ordained as archbishop of the monastery of Saint Matthew by Patriarch Ignatius George II in 1701, upon which he assumed the name Iyawannis. Matthew's brother Isaac, who had become Maphrian of the East, also participated in his ordination. In the same year as his ordination as archbishop, Matthew planted a garden (Junayna) at the monastery of Saint Matthew and paved the road to Bar Hebraeus' cell, for which an inscription in Syriac was added to the garden wall and also to the tomb of Saint Matthew to commemorate the work.

As archbishop, Matthew deputised for his brother Isaac in administering the diocese of Mosul. After the death of Basil Lazarus III, Matthew was ordained as Maphrian of the East by his brother Patriarch Ignatius Isaac II at the Monastery of Saint Ananias before September 1713, upon which he assumed the name Basil. Matthew served as Maphrian of the East until his death in September 1727, and he was buried with Isaac in his tomb at the Church of Saint Thomas at Mosul.

References

Bibliography

Maphrians
1727 deaths
18th-century Oriental Orthodox archbishops
People from Mosul
17th-century births
Assyrians from the Ottoman Empire
Oriental Orthodox bishops in the Ottoman Empire
18th-century people from the Ottoman Empire
17th-century people from the Ottoman Empire